Akira Yamamura (born 8 June 1936) is a Japanese sailor. He competed in the Flying Dutchman event at the 1972 Summer Olympics.

References

External links
 
 

1936 births
Living people
Japanese male sailors (sport)
Olympic sailors of Japan
Sailors at the 1972 Summer Olympics – Flying Dutchman
Asian Games medalists in sailing
Asian Games gold medalists for Japan
Sailors at the 1970 Asian Games
Medalists at the 1970 Asian Games
Place of birth missing (living people)